Leucopogon is a genus of about 150-160 species of shrubs or small trees in the family Ericaceae, in the section of that family formerly treated as the separate family Epacridaceae. They are native to Australia, New Zealand, New Caledonia, the western Pacific Islands and Malaysia, with the greatest species diversity in southeastern Australia. Plants in this genus have leaves with a few more or less parallel veins, and tube-shaped flowers usually with a white beard inside.

Description
Plants in the genus Leucopogon range from prostrate shrubs to small trees. The leaves are arranged alternately and usually have about three, more or less parallel veins visible on the lower surface. The flowers are arranged in leaf axils or on the ends of branchlets either singly or in spikes of a few to many flowers. There is a single egg-shaped to circular bract and a pair of similar bracteoles at the base of each flower immediately below the five sepals. The sepals are similar to the bracts but larger. The petals are fused to form a tube with the five petal tips rolled back or spreading, usually with a beard of white hairs inside. The stamens are attached to the tube near its tip and have a short filament and the tip of the style is thin. The fruit is a drupe.

Taxonomy and naming
The genus Leucopogon was first formally described in 1810 by Robert Brown in his Prodromus.

In 2005, following cladistic analysis, in a paper published in Australian Systematic Botany, Christopher John Quinn and others transferred some species previously known as species of Leucopogon to other genera, including Androstoma Hook.f.]], [[Acrotriche|Acrotriche R.Br., Acrothamnus Quinn and Agiortia Quinn. These species include the former L. colensoi, L. milliganii, L. maccraei, L. montanus. These, and other changes proposed have been accepted by the Australian Plant Census ("APC") but not the change of L. melaleucoides to Acrothamnus melaleucoides.

Further molecular phylogenetic analysis of Styphelia and related genera by Crayn and others in 2018 have led to further proposed changes, not yet assessed by the APC as at April 2020. These changes include moving 75 species of Leucopogon to Styphelia.

The genus name, Leucopogon is derived from ancient Greek words meaning "white" and "beard", referring to the petal tube.

Species list
The following is a list of species accepted by the Australian Plant Census as at April 2020 and by the New Zealand Plant Conservation Network for species occurring in New Zealand. There is a proposal to move the species marked with an asterisk to the genus Styphelia.

Leucopogon acicularis Benth. (WA)
Leucopogon acuminatus R.Br. (NT) *
Leucopogon affinis R.Br. – lance beard-heath (SA, Qld, NSW, Vic, Tas)
Leucopogon allittii F.Muell. (WA) *
Leucopogon alternifolius R.Br. (WA)
Leucopogon altissimus Hislop (WA)
Leucopogon amplectens Ostenf. (WA)
Leucopogon amplexicaulis  – beard heath (Rudge) R.Br. (NSW)
Leucopogon apiculatus R.Br. (WA)
Leucopogon appressus R.Br. (NSW) *
Leucopogon assimilis R.Br. (WA)
Leucopogon atherolepis Stschegl. (WA)
Leucopogon attenuatus A.Cunn. – grey beard-heath (Qld, NSW, ACT, Vic) *
Leucopogon audax Hislop (WA)
Leucopogon australis R.Br. – spiked beard-heath (WA, Vic, Tas)
Leucopogon biflorus R.Br. (Qld, NSW) *
Leucopogon blakei Pedley (Qld) *
Leucopogon blepharolepis F.Muell. (WA) *
Leucopogon borealis Hislop & A.R.Chapm. (WA)
Leucopogon bossiaea (F.Muell.) Benth. (WA)
Leucopogon bracteolaris Benth. (WA)
Leucopogon brevicuspis Benth. (WA) *
Leucopogon breviflorus F.Muell. (WA) *
Leucopogon canaliculatus Hislop (WA)
Leucopogon capitellatus DC. (WA)
Leucopogon carinatus R.Br. (WA)
Leucopogon cinereus E.Pritz. (WA)
Leucopogon clelandii Cheel (SA, Vic) *
Leucopogon cochlearifolius Strid (WA)
Leucopogon collinus  (Labill.) R.Br. – fringed beard-heath (NSW, Vic, Tas) 
Leucopogon compactus Stschegl. (WA)
Leucopogon conchifolius Strid (WA) *
Leucopogon concinnus Benth. (WA) *
Leucopogon concurvus F.Muell. (SA)
Leucopogon confertus Benth. (NSW)  * 
Leucopogon conostephioides DC. (WA) *
Leucopogon cordatus Sond. (WA)
Leucopogon cordifolius Lindl. (WA, SA, Vic) *
Leucopogon corymbiformis Hislop (WA)
Leucopogon corynocarpus Sond. (WA) *
Leucopogon costatus (F.Muell.) J.M.Black  (SA, Vic)
Leucopogon crassiflorus (F.Muell.) Benth. (WA) *
Leucopogon crassifolius Sond. (WA) *
Leucopogon cryptanthus Benth. (WA)
Leucopogon cucullatus R.Br. (WA)
Leucopogon cuneifolius Stschegl. (WA) *
Leucopogon cuspidatus R.Br. (Qld) *
Leucopogon cymbiformis (A.Cunn.) ex DC. (WA) *
Leucopogon darlingensis Hislop (WA)
Leucopogon darlingensis Hislop subsp. darlingensis (WA)
Leucopogon darlingensis subsp. rectus Hislop (WA)
Leucopogon decrescens Hislop (WA)
Leucopogon decussatus Stschegl. (WA)
Leucopogon deformis R.Br. (Qld, NSW) *
Leucopogon denticulatus W.Fitzg. (WA)
Leucopogon dielsianus E.Pritz. (WA) *
Leucopogon distans R.Br. (WA)
Leucopogon diversifolius Hislop (WA)
Leucopogon elatior Sond. (WA)
Leucopogon elegans Sond. (WA)
Leucopogon elegans Sond. var. elegans
Leucopogon elegans subsp. psorophyllus Hislop (WA)
Leucopogon ericoides (Sm.) R.Br. (SA, Qld, NSW, Vic, Tas) *
Leucopogon esquamatus R.Br. (NSW, Vic, Tas) *
Leucopogon exolasius (F.Muell.) Benth. (NSW)  *
Leucopogon extremus Hislop & Puente-Lel. (WA)
Leucopogon fasciculatus (G.Forst.) A.Rich. (New Zealand)
Leucopogon fimbriatus Stschegl. (WA)
Leucopogon flavescens Sond. (WA) *
Leucopogon flavescens var. brevifolius Benth. (WA) *
Leucopogon flavescens Sond. var. flavescens (WA) *
Leucopogon fletcheri Maiden & Betche (NSW, ACT, Vic) *
Leucopogon fletcheri subsp. brevisepalus J.M.Powell (NSW, ACT, Vic) *
Leucopogon fletcheri Maiden & Betche subsp. fletcheri *
Leucopogon flexifolius R.Br. (Qld) *
Leucopogon florulentus Benth. (WA)
Leucopogon foliosus Hislop (WA)
Leucopogon fraseri A.Cunn. (NSW, ACT, Vic, Tas, NZ) *
Leucopogon gelidus N.A.Wakef. (NSW, ACT, Vic)
Leucopogon gibbosus Stschegl. (WA)
Leucopogon gilbertii Stschegl. (WA) 
Leucopogon glabellus R.Br. (WA)
Leucopogon glacialis Lindl. (SA, Vic)
Leucopogon glaucifolius W.Fitzg. (WA) *
Leucopogon gnaphalioides Stschegl. (WA)
Leucopogon gracilis R.Br. (WA)
Leucopogon gracillimus DC. (WA)
Leucopogon grammatus Hislop (WA)
Leucopogon grandiflorus Pedley (Qld) *
Leucopogon hamulosus E.Pritz. (WA) *
Leucopogon hirsutus Sond. (WA, SA)
Leucopogon hispidus E.Pritz. (WA) *
Leucopogon imbricatus R.Br. (Qld) *
Leucopogon incisus Hislop (WA)
Leucopogon inflexus Hislop (WA)
Leucopogon infuscatus Strid (WA)
Leucopogon insularis A.Cunn. ex DC. (WA) *
Leucopogon interruptus R.Br. (WA)
Leucopogon interstans Hislop (WA)
Leucopogon juniperinus R.Br. (Qld, NSW, Vic) *
Leucopogon lasiophyllus Stschegl. (WA)
Leucopogon lasiostachyus Stschegl. (WA)
Leucopogon lavarackii Pedley (Qld) *
Leucopogon leptanthus Benth. (WA) *
Leucopogon leptospermoides R.Br. (Qld, NSW) *
Leucopogon lloydiorum Strid (WA)
Leucopogon malayanus Jack (Qld, Cambodia, Malaya, Myanmar, Thailand, Vietnam) *
Leucopogon malayanus subsp. malayanus *
Leucopogon malayanus subsp. novoguineensis *
Leucopogon margarodes R.Br. (Qld, NSW) *
Leucopogon marginatus W.Fitzg. (WA) * 
Leucopogon maritimus Hislop (WA)
Leucopogon melaleucoides A.Cunn. ex DC. (Qld, NSW)
Leucopogon microcarpus Hislop (WA)
Leucopogon microphyllus (Cav.) R.Br. (Qld, NSW, ACT, Vic) 
Leucopogon microphyllus (Cav.) R.Br. var. microphyllus
Leucopogon microphyllus var. pilibundus (A.Cunn. ex DC.) Benth.
Leucopogon mitchellii Benth. (Qld) *
Leucopogon mollis E.Pritz. (WA)
Leucopogon multiflorus R.Br. (WA) *
Leucopogon muticus R.Br. (Qld, NSW) *
Leucopogon nanum M.I.Dawson & Heenan (NZ) * 
Leucopogon navicularis Hislop (WA)
Leucopogon neoanglicus F.Muell. ex Benth. (Qld, NSW) *
Leucopogon neurophyllus F.Muell. (Vic) 
Leucopogon newbeyi Hislop (WA)
Leucopogon nitidus Hislop (WA)
Leucopogon nutans E.Pritz. (WA) *
Leucopogon obovatus (Labill.) R.Br. (WA)
Leucopogon obovatus (Labill.) R.Br. subsp. obovatus 
Leucopogon obovatus subsp. revolutus (R.Br.) Hislop
Leucopogon obtectus Benth. (WA) *
Leucopogon obtusatus Sond. (WA)
Leucopogon oldfieldii Benth. (WA)
Leucopogon oliganthus E.Pritz. (WA)
Leucopogon opponens (F.Muell.) Benth. (WA)
Leucopogon oppositifolius Sond. (WA)
Leucopogon ovalifolius Sond. (WA) *
Leucopogon oxycedrus Sond. (WA) *
Leucopogon ozothamnoides Benth. (WA)
Leucopogon parviflorus (Andrews) Lindl. (WA, SA, Qld, NSW, LHI, Vic, Tas, NZ) 
Leucopogon pendulus R.Br. (WA) *
Leucopogon penicillatus Stschegl. (WA)
Leucopogon phyllostachys Benth. (WA)
Leucopogon pilifer N.A.Wakef. (NSW, Vic, Tas)
Leucopogon pimeleoides A.Cunn. ex DC. (Qld, NSW)
Leucopogon planifolius Sond. (WA) *
Leucopogon plumuliflorus (F.Muell.) F.Muell. ex Benth. (WA)
Leucopogon pogonocalyx Benth. (WA) *
Leucopogon polymorphus Sond. (WA)
Leucopogon polystachyus R.Br. (WA)
Leucopogon prolatus Hislop (WA)
Leucopogon propinquus R.Br. (WA) *
Leucopogon psammophilus E.Pritz. (WA)
Leucopogon psilopus Stschegl. (WA) *
Leucopogon pubescens S.Moore (WA) *
Leucopogon pulchellus Sond. (WA)
Leucopogon racemulosus DC. (WA) *
Leucopogon recurvisepalus C.T.White (Qld, NSW) *
Leucopogon reflexus R.Br. (WA)
Leucopogon remotus Hislop (WA)
Leucopogon rigidus A.Cunn. ex DC. (WA) *
Leucopogon riparius N.A.Wakef. (Vic) *
Leucopogon rodwayi Summerh. (NSW)
Leucopogon rotundifolius R.Br. (WA) *
Leucopogon rubricaulis R.Br. (WA)
Leucopogon rufus Lindl. (SA, NSW, Vic) *
Leucopogon rugulosus Hislop (WA)
Leucopogon rupicola C.T.White (Qld) *
Leucopogon ruscifolius R.Br. (Qld) *
Leucopogon setiger R.Br. (NSW)  *
Leucopogon simulans Hislop (WA)
Leucopogon sonderensis J.H.Willis (NT) *
Leucopogon spectabilis Hislop & A.R.Chapm. (WA)
Leucopogon sprengelioides Sond. (WA)
Leucopogon squarrosus Benth. (WA)
Leucopogon squarrosus Benth. subsp. squarrosus (WA)
Leucopogon squarrosus subsp. trigynus Hislop (WA)
Leucopogon stenophyllus Hislop (WA)
Leucopogon stokesii Hislop (WA)
Leucopogon striatus R.Br. (WA)
Leucopogon strictus Benth. (WA) *
Leucopogon strongylophyllus F.Muell. (WA) *
Leucopogon subsejunctus Hislop (WA)
Leucopogon tamariscinus R.Br. (WA)
Leucopogon tamminensis E.Pritz. (WA) *
Leucopogon tamminensis var. australis E.Pritz. (WA) *
Leucopogon tamminensis E.Pritz. var. tamminensis (WA) *
Leucopogon tenuicaulis J.M.Powell ex Hislop (WA)
Leucopogon tenuis DC. (WA)
Leucopogon tetragonus Sond. (WA)
Leucopogon thymifolius Lindl. ex Benth. (WA)
Leucopogon trichostylus J.M.Powell (Qld, NSW *
Leucopogon unilateralis Stschegl. (WA)
Leucopogon validus  Hislop & A.R.Chapm. (WA)
Leucopogon verticillatus R.Br. (WA)
Leucopogon virgatus (Labill.) R.Br. (SA, Qld, NSW, ACT, Vic, Tas)
Leucopogon virgatus var. brevifolius Benth. (SA, Vic, Tas)
Leucopogon virgatus (Labill.) R.Br. var. virgatus (SA, ACT, Vic, Tas)
Leucopogon wheelerae Hislop (WA)
Leucopogon woodsii F.Muell. (WA, SA, Vic) *
Leucopogon yorkensis Pedley (Qld) *

References

 
Ericaceae genera